{{Speciesbox
|image = Anathallis rubens.jpg
|genus = Anathallis
|species = rubens
|authority = (Lindl.) Pridgeon & M.W. Chase (2001)
|synonyms = 
Pleurothallis rubens Lindl. (1835)  (Basionym)
Humboldtia rubens (Lindl.) Kuntze (1891)
Specklinia rubens (Lindl.) F. Barros (1983)
Pleurothallis rubens var. latifolia Cogn. (1896)Pleurothallis rubens var. longifolia Cogn. (1896)Pleurothallis montserratii Porsch (1905)Pleurothallis amblyopetala Schltr. (1913)Pleurothallis excisa C. Schweinf. (1953)Anathallis amblyopetala (Schltr.) Pridgeon & M.W. Chase (2001)
}}Anathallis rubens'' is a species of orchid.

References

External links 

rubens